Elbayon is an urban-type settlement in Surxondaryo Region, Uzbekistan. It is part of Shoʻrchi District. The town population in 2003 was 4900 people.

References

Populated places in Surxondaryo Region
Urban-type settlements in Uzbekistan